Dargar-e Babgohar (also Romanized as Dargar-e Bābgohar; also known as Bābgohar) is a village in Hotkan Rural District, in the Central District of Zarand County, Kerman Province, Iran. At the 2006 census, its population was 91, in 37 families.

References 

Populated places in Zarand County